Nick Bassett is an American musician, producer and composer from Modesto, California. He was the bassist of shoegaze band Nothing and is the lead guitarist of shoegaze band Whirr. He also played guitar in the original lineup of blackgaze band Deafheaven.

Career 
Bassett formed Whirl in October 2009. The band changed its name to Whirr after a musician also named Whirl trademarked the name and threatened legal action. Bassett wrote demo versions of songs and showed them to the other members, after which they decided to play shoegazing-influenced music.

Bassett played bass for Philadelphia shoegaze band Nothing from 2013 to 2018. Prior to his joining, Whirr had toured with Nothing in the spring of 2013, during which he collaborated with Nothing frontman Domenic Palermo on a goth-influenced side project called Death of Lovers. Death of Lovers debuted with Buried Under a World of Roses in October 2013, followed by their first full-length album, The Acrobat, in November 2017.

Bassett formed the indie pop duo Camera Shy with ex-Whirr singer Alexandra Morte in 2014. They released their debut EP, Jack-O-Lantern, on June 24, 2014 and their eponymous debut album on July 14, 2015.

In 2016, Bassett composed the score for Bret Easton Ellis' television series The Deleted.

Bassett collaborated with Cloakroom on their 2017 album Time Well, contributing piano parts.

Whirr released Feels Like You, their third full-length album, in October 2019.

Discography

With Nothing 
 Tired of Tomorrow (2016, Relapse)
 Dance on the Blacktop (2018, Relapse)

With Whirr 
 Demo (2010, self-released)
 Distressor EP (2011, Graveface)
 June (2011, Tee Pee)
 Pipe Dreams (2012, Tee Pee)
 Whirr / Anne (split with Anne) (2012, Run For Cover)
 "Color Change"/"Flat Lining" (split with Monster Movie) (2012, Graveface)
 Around (2013, Graveface)
 Part Time Punks Sessions (2013, Run For Cover)
 Sway (2014, Graveface)
 Whirr / Nothing (split with Nothing) (2014, Run For Cover)
Feels Like You (2019, self-released)
Live In Los Angeles (2023, self-released)
 Muta / Blue Sugar (2023, self-released)

With Camera Shy 
 Jack-O-Lantern (2014, Run For Cover)
 Whirr / Crying / Makthaverskan / Camera Shy (2014, Run For Cover)
 Crystal Clear (2015, Run For Cover)
 Camera Shy (2015, Run For Cover)

With Death of Lovers 
 Buried Under a World of Roses (2013, Deathwish)
 The Acrobat (2017, Dais Records)

With Deafheaven 
 Roads to Judah (2011, Deathwish)
 Live at The Blacktop (2011, Deathwish)

With Cloakroom
  Time Well (2017, Relapse)

With Silence in the Snow
  Levitation Chamber (2019, Prophecy Productions)

With Pink Slip
  Perpetual Care (2020, self-released)

With Oubliette
  Big Spin EP (2021, self-released)

In film and television 
 The Deleted (Credited as Composer of Theme & Score, 2016, Directed by Brett-Easton Ellis)
 The Night Ripper (Credited as Composer,  2017, Puppet Combo)
 Party Favor (Credited as Composer,  2019)
 Direct Appeal  (Credited as Composer of Theme,  2019)
 Women & Crime (Credited as Composer of Theme,  2019)

Production and audio engineering 
 Camera Shy – Jack-O-Lantern (2014, Run For Cover)
 "Whirr / Crying / Makthaverskan / Camera Shy (2014, Run For Cover)
 Camera Shy – Crystal Clear (2015, Run For Cover)
 Camera Shy – Camera Shy (2015, Run For Cover)
 Death Of Lovers – The Acrobat (2017, Dais Records)
 Night School – Disappear Here (2019,  Graveface)
 Night Sins – Portrait In Silver (2019,  Funeral Party)
 Fearing – Shadow (2020,  Funeral Party)
 Nothing – GEORGE (2020,  Self-released)
 Nothing – The Great Dismal (2020,  Relapse)
 Luster – Blue Oblivion (2020,  Funeral Party)
 White Lighters – S/T (2021,  Coming Home)
 Fawning – Illusions of control  (2021,  Graveface / Nevernotgoth)
 Beachy Head – S/T'' (2021,  Graveface)

References 

American rock bass guitarists
Songwriters from California
Living people
Year of birth missing (living people)
Record producers from California
American male composers
Deafheaven members
Whirr (band) members
American male songwriters